Stathmodera lineata is a species of beetle in the family Cerambycidae. It was described by Gahan in 1890. It is known from Sierra Leone.

References

Apomecynini
Beetles described in 1890
Taxa named by Charles Joseph Gahan